Robert Claiborne (born July 10, 1967) is a former American football wide receiver. He played for the San Diego Chargers in 1992, the Tampa Bay Buccaneers in 1993 and for the Las Vegas Posse in 1994.

References

1967 births
Living people
American football wide receivers
San Diego State Aztecs football players
San Diego Chargers players
Tampa Bay Buccaneers players
Las Vegas Posse players